American singer David Cook has released four albums, 3 EPs, and 17 singles. Before appearing on American Idol, Cook self-released an album Analog Heart in 2006. During his run on the show, it was removed from sale. As of 2009, the album has sold fewer than 5,000 units in the United States.

He released his first single "The Time of My Life" after his win, followed by the lead single "Light On" from his first major-label album, the eponymous David Cook. Both "The Time of My Life" and "Light On" have each sold over a million copies, while his second single from the album "Come Back to Me" sold over 500,000. His self-titled album was released on November 18, 2008, via RCA Records. The album debuted at number three on the Billboard 200 chart, and was certified Platinum by the Recording Industry Association of America on January 22, 2009. The album was also certified Gold by the Canadian Recording Industry Association.

Cook's second major label album This Loud Morning was released on June 28, 2011, and debuted at number seven in the Billboard 200.  The lead single from the album was "The Last Goodbye". His fourth studio album Digital Vein was released on September 18, 2015.

Studio albums

Extended plays

Singles

As lead artist

Other charted songs

Videography

Music videos

Footnotes

References

American Idol discographies
Discographies of American artists
Rock music discographies